Gibbula vimontiae is a species of sea snail, a marine gastropod mollusk in the family Trochidae, the top snails.

Description
The height of the shell attains 3 mm.

Distribution
This species occurs in the Mediterranean Sea.

References

 Monterosato T. A. (di) (1883–1885). Conchiglie littorali mediterranee. Naturalista Siciliano, Palermo, 3(3): 87–91 (1883); 3(4): 102–111; 3(5): 137–140; 3(6): 159–163; 3(8): 227–231; 3(10): 277–281; 4(1–2): 21–25; 4(3): 60–63 (1884); 4(4): 80–84; 4(8): 200–204 (1885)
 Oberling J.J., 1970: Quelques espèces nouvelles de Gastropodes du bassin Méditerranéen; Kleine Mitteilungen, Naturhistorisches Museum Bern
1: 1–7

External links
 

vimontiae
Gastropods described in 1884